is a weekly news magazine based in Belgrade, Serbia.

History

Launch
In 1990, dissatisfied with the media climate in SR Serbia, SFR Yugoslavia's largest constituent unit, a group of liberal Serbian intellectuals, including prominent lawyer Srđa Popović, decided to start a weekly newsmagazine. Following a seven-month preparation throughout the year, Vreme was launched with its first issue coming out on 29 October 1990, little over a month before the 1990 general election in SR Serbia as the entire country of SFR Yugoslavia was transforming its governance from a one-party system under the Yugoslav Communist League (SKJ) to a multi-party one.

Most Vreme'''s original staff were journalists from Politika and NIN. It characterizes itself as "a magazine without lies, hatred, or prejudice" and has opposed nationalistic mobilization for the Yugoslav wars.Kurspahić, Kemal (2003). Prime Time Crime: Balkan Media in War and Peace. p.54. US Institute of Peace Press. . It is modeled after its U.S. counterparts Time and Newsweek.

In 1993, 30,000 copies were produced weekly with a quarter of its sales abroad. Vreme has established a reputation as one of the most reliable media sources of the former Yugoslavia and its writers have been largely cited by international media.J. Williams, Carol (23 March 1993). "[Magazine Makes Assault on Serbian Nationalism: Scrappy Vreme Has Emerged as Yugoslavia's Most Trusted Chronicle of War]". Los Angeles Times. Accessed 7 September 2009.Vreme has started a number of supplements such as Vreme novca (Time of Money), Vreme zabave (Time for Fun), and has become a publishing house. The newspaper has an international edition called Vreme International, which is mainly targeted at the Serbian diaspora in Europe.

See alsoYutelMonitor References 

 External links 
https://web.archive.org/web/20110217062904/http://www.vreme.com/ (Has archive from last issue in 1998 to present day)
http://www.scc.rutgers.edu/serbian_digest (Archive of every issue from late September 1991 to 1997)
Novinari kupili nedeljnik "Vreme", Blic'', 23 April 2008

1990 establishments in Serbia
Magazines established in 1990
Mass media in Belgrade
News magazines published in Europe
Magazines published in Serbia
Serbian-language magazines
Weekly magazines